The Central District of Qom County is a district in Qom County, Qom Province, Iran. At the 2006 census, its population was 988,462, in 248,913 families.  The District has two cities: Qom and Qanavat. The District contains two rural districts: Qomrud Rural District and Qanavat Rural District

References 

Districts of Qom Province
Qom County